Aida Mohamed (born 12 March 1976) is a Hungarian foil fencer, silver medallist at the 1993 World Championships and team gold medallist at the 2007 European Championships. She is the only Hungarian athlete in history to have competed at seven different Olympic Games (from 1996 to 2020).

Career
Mohamed was born in Budapest from a Hungarian mother and a Syrian father. She was too shy in primary school to join the local fencing team, but her PE teacher persuaded her to give it a go. She then trained at the MTK sports club in Budapest with fencing master Antal Solti, who remained her personal coach . She won in 1991 a bronze medal at the Cadet European Fencing Championships and the gold medal at the Junior World Championships. She retained her Junior title in 1992 and won it again in 1996.

At senior level she won her first major medal in 1992 with a silver medal at the 1992 European Championships, followed with another silver at the 1993 World Championships. She won the bronze medal at the foil 2006 World Fencing Championships after she lost 15–3 to Valentina Vezzali in the semi-finals.

Mohamed transferred to Törekvés SE in 2009 after 23 years at MTK, but continued training with Antal Solti.

Personal life
She married in 2005 former Canadian Olympic pentathlete and épée fencer, Laurie Shong, whom she met at the 1999 Seoul World Cup. They have two daughters, Olívia, born in 2009, and Leila, born in 2014.

Awards
 Hungarian Junior fencer of the Year (3): 1991, 1992, 1995
 Masterly youth athlete: 1992, 1993, 1994, 1995, 1996
 Hungarian Youth Athlete of the Year (1): 1992
 Hungarian Fencer of the Year (5): 1993, 2002, 2003, 2007, 2012

Orders and special awards
   Cross of Merit of the Republic of Hungary – Silver Cross (2004)
   Cross of Merit of the Republic of Hungary – Golden Cross (2008)

References

External links
 
  (archive)
 
 

1976 births
Living people
Hungarian female foil fencers
Fencers at the 1996 Summer Olympics
Fencers at the 2000 Summer Olympics
Fencers at the 2004 Summer Olympics
Fencers at the 2008 Summer Olympics
Fencers at the 2012 Summer Olympics
Fencers at the 2016 Summer Olympics
Olympic fencers of Hungary
Hungarian people of Syrian descent
Martial artists from Budapest
Universiade medalists in fencing
Universiade silver medalists for Hungary
Medalists at the 1999 Summer Universiade
Fencers at the 2020 Summer Olympics
21st-century Hungarian women